Corrhenispia is a genus of beetle in the family Cerambycidae. Its only species is Corrhenispia cylindrica. It was described by Stephan von Breuning in 1938.

References

Pteropliini
Beetles described in 1938